is a video game developed by Millennium Kitchen and published by Sony Computer Entertainment for the PlayStation 2. It is part of the popular Boku no Natsuyasumi series and was released in Japan on July 11, 2002. It is an alternate universe sequel in which the main character spends his summer in a different part of Japan from the first game. It takes place during the same summer with many of the same characters, but in a different location, a town on Japan's southern coast. A PlayStation Portable version was released on June 24, 2010.

Description
The main character spends his summer vacation at his aunt and uncle's bed and breakfast in a southern Japanese coastal town. Features from the first game, like collecting and bug battles, return, along with new facets, like swimming. The player controls the main character for the thirty-one days of August 1975.

Reception
On release, Famitsu magazine scored the game a 33 out of 40.

In Japan, sales of Boku no Natsuyasumi 2 surpassed 250,000 copies after only 17 days on shelves.

References

External links
 Official Website (SCE) 
 Official Trailers (HD) 

Single-player video games
Adventure games
Japan-exclusive video games
Sony Interactive Entertainment games
2002 video games
PlayStation 2 games
2010 video games
PlayStation Portable games
Video games developed in Japan
Video games about children
Video games about insects
Video game sequels
Video games set in 1975
Video games set in Japan
Works about vacationing
Millennium Kitchen games